Nickelodeon Director's Lab is a movie-making interactive program by Viacom New Media and published by Nickelodeon. A sequel was released called Nickelodeon Multimedia Lab.

References 

1994 video games
DOS games
DOS-only games
Filmmaking video games
Nickelodeon video games
Video games developed in the United States